Charles Henderson (30 December 1922 – 13 September 2019) was an Australian weightlifter who competed in the 1956 Summer Olympics.

References

1922 births
2019 deaths
Australian male weightlifters
Olympic weightlifters of Australia
Weightlifters at the 1956 Summer Olympics
20th-century Australian people
21st-century Australian people